Dvsn (stylized as dvsn and pronounced "division") is a Canadian R&B duo composed of singer Daniel Daley and producer Nineteen85. The duo is signed to Canadian rapper Drake through his label OVO Sound.

History

Sept. 5th
On September 5, 2015, dvsn released two songs titled "The Line" and "With Me". They initially started gaining recognition when "With Me" was played on Apple's Beats 1 radio during the seventh OVO Sound radio show. On December 2, 2015, they released their third song, titled "Too Deep" on SoundCloud and the iTunes Store. In March 2016, they released their fourth song, titled "Hallucinations" on SoundCloud and the iTunes Store. On February 29, 2016, it was announced that dvsn had signed to Drake's OVO Sound record label.

On March 11, 2016, dvsn announced the release date of their debut studio album, titled Sept. 5th, along with the album being made available for pre-order on the iTunes Store. They released the album exclusively on the iTunes Store and Apple Music on March 27, 2016, with the album releasing elsewhere on April 1, 2016.

dvsn made a guest appearance on Drake's fourth studio album, Views on the track titled "Faithful".

Morning After 
On May 5 2017, dvsn released "Think About Me" as the lead single from their second album. A month later, "Don't Choose" was released as the second single. On August 9, 2017, dvsn announced that Morning After would be the title of their next album. A new single, titled "Mood" was released on September 4, 2017. The next day, dvsn revealed that the album will be released October 13, 2017. Morning After was made available for preorder on September 22, 2017.

On April 12, 2019, dvsn made their first appearance at Coachella. The duo performed again on April 19, 2019, for the Weekend 2 of Coachella.

A Muse in Her Feelings and Cheers to the Best Memories 
On July 10, 2019, dvsn released two singles, "Miss Me?" and "In Between". On October 30, 2019, they released "No Cryin" featuring Future. They followed up this release by releasing "A Muse" and "Between Us" featuring Snoh Aalegra. On April 10, 2020, they released "Dangerous City" featuring Ty Dolla Sign and Buju Banton. dvsn released their third studio album, A Muse In Her Feelings, on April 17, 2020, via OVO Sound, to positive reviews. The album was recognized on Rated R&B's 30 Best R&B Albums of 2020 list at No. 8. The album debuted at number 23 on the Billboard 200 and number 5 on the Billboard Top R&B Albums. On January 15, 2021, dvsn released a deluxe edition of the album titled Amusing Her Feelings. It featured four new tracks, including a collaboration with R&B singer Miguel on "He Said" and 2010 Kings of Leon Song of the year "Use Somebody".

On August 20, 2021, dvsn released a collaboration album with Ty Dolla Sign titled Cheers to the Best Memories. It was preceded by two singles, "I Believed It" featuring Mac Miller on July 1, 2021, and "Memories" on August 18, 2021.

Discography

Studio albums

Collaborative albums

Singles

Guest appearances

Music videos

Tours
Headlining
 Debut Tour (2016)
 Morning After (2018)
Supporting
 Summer Sixteen Tour  (2016)
 Boy Meets World Tour  (2017)

References

External links
 

Black Canadian musical groups
Canadian musical duos
Canadian contemporary R&B musical groups
Contemporary R&B duos
Musical groups from Toronto
Musical groups established in 2015
OVO Sound artists
Warner Records artists
2015 establishments in Ontario